108 Military Central Hospital, also known in many variations as Army Medical Institute 108, or Army Central Hospital 108 is a hospital located at 1 Trần Hưng Đạo Street, in the Hoan Kiem district of Hanoi, Vietnam. It was originally a military hospital for the French army in Indochina built in 1894 known as Lanessan Hospital, (in Vietnamese: Nhà thương Đồn Thủy) and the practice hospital for Indochina Medical College (now Hanoi Medical University) which was located nearby at that time. After the communists took control over Hanoi in 1954, it turned into a central military hospital for senior officials, but now is also open to the general public. It is considered one of the most famous hospitals in Vietnam. It is the first hospital in Vietnam that carried out organ transplants (kidney, liver). It is also famous for surgery.

Nuclear medicine

The hospital has a CyberKnife centre, which features the Accuray CyberKnife stereotactic radiosurgery system for operating on cancer patients.

The hospital is the focus of a plan for a national nuclear medicine centre. In 2007, with funding from the Belgian government, construction of a 400 billion Dong cyclotron and radiotherapy centre, which was due to be completed in June, 2008. It will also be used for research and training in addition to medical treatment. It is Vietnam's first cyclotron 30 MeV accelerator. Nuclear medicine is important for both medical scans (radiology), and cancer treatment (radiotherapy). According to the IAEA, Vietnam is one of the countries with the least amount of nuclear medicine equipment. According to the Central Cancer Hospital, Vietnam has one of the world's highest rates of cancer. So the hospital is likely to increase in prominence in the near future.

Trauma surgery
Institute of Traumatology and Orthopaedics consists of four departments: General trauma –Orthopaedics; Upper limb surgery and microsurgery; Joint surgery; Spine Surgery.

Remote communities

Doctors from the hospital regularly travel to remote locations to provide medical treatment for poor communities, including communities of the other Vietnamese ethnic groups, such as the Hmong, Muong, Black Tai/White Tai, Khang, Kho Mu, and Yao.

See also
List of hospitals in Vietnam

References

External links
 From life of plenty to lifetime of battle

Hospital buildings completed in 1894
Hospitals established in 1894
Hospitals in Hanoi